Jalgaon Rural Assembly constituency is one of the eleven constituencies of the Maharashtra Vidhan Sabha located in the Jalgaon district.

It is a part of the Jalgaon (Lok Sabha constituency) along with five other assembly constituencies, viz Jalgaon City, Erandol Assembly constituency, Amalner Assembly constituency, Chalisgaon and Pachora.

As per orders of Delimitation of Parliamentary and Assembly constituencies Order, 2008, No. 14 Jalgaon Rural Assembly constituency is composed of the following: 
1. Jalgaon Tehsil (Part) Revenue Circle Kanalde, Asoda, Jalgaon, Nashirabad and Mhasawad 2. Dharangaon Tehsil of Jalgaon district.

Members of Legislative Assembly
 2009: Deokar Gulabrao Baburao, Nationalist Congress Party
 2014: Gulab Raghunath Patil, Shiv Sena
 2019: Gulab Raghunath Patil, Shiv Sena

Past Elections

appa devkar Assembly Elections 2009

See also
Jalgaon

References

Assembly constituencies of Maharashtra
Jalgaon